Kevin O'Morrison (May 25, 1916 – December 11, 2016) was an American playwright and actor. He played the lead actor in the TV series Charlie Wild, Private Detective (1950–51) for the first seven episodes. The series began on CBS Television, and then moved to ABC, and finally DuMont.

He started his career working as a stage, radio, television, and film actor in the 1940s. He began writing plays in the 1960s, including A Party For Lovers and The Long War. In 1993, O'Morrison played Cliff Reed in Sleepless in Seattle, starring Tom Hanks and Meg Ryan.

O'Morrison died on December 11, 2016, in Lynnwood, Washington, at the age of 100. He was survived by his wife, Linda.

References

External links

1916 births
2016 deaths
20th-century American dramatists and playwrights
American centenarians
American male film actors
American male stage actors
Male actors from St. Louis
Men centenarians
Writers from Missouri